William Thompson Bacon (August 24, 1812 – May 18, 1881) was an American minister, editor, and author.

Bacon, son of Daniel and Rebecca (Thompson) Bacon, was born in Woodbury, Conn, August 24, 1812.

He entered Yale College at the age of 21, after having spent several years in mercantile life, and graduated in 1837.  After graduation, he studied theology in the Yale Divinity School for three years, and was ordained, Dec. 28, 1842, pastor of the Congregational Church in Trumbull, Conn., which charge he resigned on account of ill health, May 28, 1844.

In 1845-6 he edited the New Englander, a quarterly magazine published in New Haven, and in the later year joined in establishing the New Haven Morning Journal and Courier, which he edited until 1849. For the next year or two he supplied the pulpit of the Congregational Church in South Britain, a parish of Southbury, Conn.; and subsequently, in 1853-4, supplied his old church in Trumbull, while residing in the family homestead in Woodbury.  He also conducted a boarding and day school in Woodbury for some years. In 1866 he removed to Derby, Conn., and soon with a view of providing occupation for his sons became proprietor and editor of the Derby Transcript, a weekly paper, which he conducted with vigor. A great sufferer, for the most of his life from dyspepsia and erysipelas, he died after a week's illness, in Derby, May 18, 1881, aged nearly 69 years.

His literary tastes were already marked while in college. He was, if not the earliest to suggest, one of the most earnest supporters of the Yale Literary Magazine, of which he was one of the first board of editors. He published three volumes of poems, the last in 1880.

He was married August 7, 1839, to Elizabeth A., eldest daughter of Dr. Jonathan Knight, Professor of Anatomy and Surgery in Yale College, who survived him with five sons and two daughters. One daughter and one son died before him.

External links

1812 births
1881 deaths
People from Woodbury, Connecticut
Yale Divinity School alumni
American Congregationalist ministers
American newspaper editors
American male poets
19th-century American poets
19th-century American male writers
American male non-fiction writers
Yale College alumni
19th-century American clergy